Danair A/S was an airline in Denmark, headquartered in Kastrup, Tårnby Municipality.

History
It was a joint venture between Scandinavian Airlines System (51% ownership), Maersk Air (34%) and Cimber Air. The three companies marketed all domestic flights from the cooperation started in 1971 until the liberalization of the airline market in the European Union in 1995.

SAS flew the routes from Copenhagen Airport to Aalborg, Aarhus and Karup, as well as the Greenland airports of Kangerlussuaq and Narsarsuaq. Maersk Air flew the routes to Billund, Rønne, Esbjerg, Vojens and Odense. Cimber Air flew the routes to Sønderborg.

Gallery

References

Defunct airlines of Denmark
Danish companies established in 1971
Airlines established in 1971
Airlines disestablished in 1995
Scandinavian Airlines
Maersk Air
1971 establishments in Denmark
1995 disestablishments in Denmark